

Seeds

Qualifiers

Lucky losers
  Mariana Díaz Oliva /  Lourdes Domínguez Lino

Draw

First qualifier

Second qualifier

Third qualifier

Fourth qualifier

External links
 Official Results Archive (WTA)
2000 US Open – Women's draws and results at the International Tennis Federation

2000 US Open (tennis)
US Open (tennis) by year – Qualifying